Nanfaxin may refer to:

 Nanfaxin Station, Beijing Subway, China
 Nanfaxin, Beijing, in Shunyi District, Beijing, China